Estádio Municipal Dr. Mário Martins Pereira, usually known simply as Estádio Martins Pereira is a football (soccer) stadium in São José dos Campos, São Paulo state, Brazil. The stadium holds 12,234 people. It was inaugurated in 1970. The stadium is owned by the Municipality of Albergaria-a-Velha, and its formal name honors Mário Martins Pereira, who, together with his brother, called Nélson, donated the groundplot where the stadium was built.

History

The city's stadium in the late 1960s, called Estádio da Rua Antônio Saes, had a maximum capacity of only 5,000 people, and wood bleachers, so, it was sold to allow the building of Estádio Martins Pereira. The stadium construction started in 1968. During the stadium construction time, the football clubs of the city were deactivated.

The inaugural match was played on March 15, 1970, when Atlético Mineiro beat Internacional 1-0. The first goal of the stadium was scored by Atlético Mineiro's Dadá Maravilha.

On March 22, 1970, São José Esporte Clube played its first match at the stadium. São José and Nacional (SP) drew 0-0.

On November 22, 1987, the stadium's largest score was set, when São José beat Saad of São Caetano do Sul 8-0.

The stadium's attendance record currently stands at 19,000 people, set on May 11, 1997 when São José and São Paulo drew 1-1. However, as it was Mother's Day, women were allowed to watch the match without paying tickets, so, approximately 5,000 women showed up, increasing the match's attendance to 24,000 people.

References

Enciclopédia do Futebol Brasileiro, Volume 2 - Lance, Rio de Janeiro: Aretê Editorial S/A, 2001.

External links
Templos do Futebol
Mancha Azul Website
Stadium capacity at Futebol do Interior website

Sports venues in São Paulo (state)
São José dos Campos
Football venues in São Paulo (state)